Clabbers is a game played by tournament Scrabble players for fun, or occasionally at Scrabble variant tournaments.  The name derives from the fact that the words CLABBERS and SCRABBLE form an anagram pair.

Rules
The rules are identical to those of Scrabble, except that valid plays are only required to form anagrams of acceptable words; in other words, the letters in a word do not need to be placed in the correct order. If a word is challenged, the player who played the word must then name an acceptable word that anagrams to the tiles played.

Because the number of "words" that can be formed is vastly larger than in standard English, the board usually ends up tightly packed in places, and necessarily quite empty in others. Game scores will often be much higher than in standard Scrabble, due to the relative ease of making high-scoring overlap plays and easier access to premium squares.

Web version
The Internet Scrabble Club offers the ability to play Clabbers online.

Example game (SOWPODS)

Horizontal words from top to bottom (# denotes words that exist in the Collins English Dictionary but not the TWL). Some of the words below have multiple anagrams:

ALI = AIL
TOD = DOT
ISNAETCR = CANISTER
WOPL = PLOW
DEER = DEER
ZIF = FIZ
SIATX = TAXIS
BTADEI = BAITED
MGU = GUM
EMING = MINGE#
ECOPU = COUPE
RATHE = HEART
IQ = QI
VUEJ = JUVE#
EWY = WYE
ODOR = ODOR
ASSGEOU = GASEOUS
ROH = RHO

Vertical words from left to right

ATIW = WAIT
KAMER = MAKER
LOSODF = FLOODS
GCALINS = SCALING
IDNPE = PINED
UOT = OUT
ALEZ = LAZE
PHA = HAP
RSITOUEN = ROUTINES
FIAR = FAIR
EBRYE = BEERY
XIM = MIX
NAV = VAN
UO = OU#
GULNED = LUNGED
JOR = JOR#
RO = OR

References

Mentions of Clabbers on the National Scrabble Association (USA) website
An A-Z of Variants, Association of British Scrabble Players
"V-A-K-I-L: 'VAKIL' is a word? No way! Scrabble for the serious at District 14", The Boston Globe, October 7, 2001

Scrabble variants